Walbury Hill is a summit of the North Wessex Downs in Berkshire, England. On the hill's summit is the Iron Age hill fort of Walbury Camp, whilst the flanks of the hill lie within the Inkpen and Walbury Hills SSSI. The hill is one of three nationally important chalk wild grasslands in the North Wessex Downs, the others being in the Rushmore and Conholt Downs SSSI and the Hog's Hole SSSI. The summit of the hill is marked by a triangulation pillar, but lies on private land with no public access, although public access is available to the north of the summit via a byway.

Walbury Hill lies on the north-facing ridgeline of the North Hampshire Downs section of the North Wessex Downs, flanked to the west by Inkpen Hill and to the east by Combe Hill and Pilot Hill. Combe Gibbet stands to the west on Gallows Down between Walbury and Inkpen Hills.

The hill is accessible by minor roads at both its western and eastern sides, and there are car parks at the closest point of approach of each road. The westerly car park at Walbury Hill is the starting point for both the Test Way and the Wayfarer's Walk long distance footpaths. The Wayfarer's Walk utilises the byway across the hill, before continuing south and east to Emsworth in Hampshire. The Test Way heads in the opposite direction, via Combe Gibbet and Inkpen Hill, before turning south to Eling in Hampshire.

The hill lies within the civil parishes of Combe (which includes the summit), Inkpen and West Woodhay, all of which are within the unitary authority area of West Berkshire and the ceremonial county of Berkshire. It forms part of the Kirby House estate, owned by the Astor family. 

Before the use of satellites was commonplace, Walbury Hill was occasionally used by the BBC as a temporary relay station during events at Newbury Racecourse. There is a small low-level circular brick building, approximately 6 feet (1.8 metres) high, on the south side of the hill, which appears to be a disused reservoir.

Gallery

Notes

References

Hills of Berkshire
Hills of Hampshire
Hill forts in Berkshire
History of Hampshire
Marilyns of England
West Berkshire District
Sites of Special Scientific Interest in Berkshire
Highest points of English counties